WDMG may refer to:

 WDMG (AM), a radio station (860 AM) licensed to Douglas, Georgia, United States
 WDMG-FM, a radio station (97.9 FM) licensed to Ambrose, Georgia, United States